Blue Prism is the trading name of the Blue Prism Group plc, a British multinational software corporation that pioneered and makes enterprise robotic process automation (RPA) software that provides a digital workforce designed to automate complex, end-to-end operational activities. In March 2022, Blue Prism was acquired by SS&C Technologies.

Blue Prism's headquarters are at 2 Cinnamon Park Crab Lane Warrington WA2 0XP, UK with regional offices in the U.S. and Australia. The company was listed on the London Stock Exchange AIM market until its acquisition.

History

Formation
Blue Prism was founded in 2001 by a group of process automation experts to develop technology that could be used to improve the efficiency and effectiveness of organisations. Initially their focus was on the back office where they recognised an enormous unfulfilled need for automation. The company was co-founded by Alastair Bathgate and David Moss to provide a new approach that today is known as robotic process automation, or RPA.

In 2003, Blue Prism's first commercial product, Automate, was launched. In 2005, the second version of Automate was released with features for large scale processing. Co-operative Financial Services began using Blue Prism software in 2005 to automate manual processes in customer services.

Robotic Process Automation
Robotic process automation (RPA) is the application of technology that provides organizations with a digital workforce that follows rule-based business processes and interacts with the organizations' systems in the same way that existing users currently do. Blue Prism has been credited for coining the term "Robotic Process Automation."

RPA is a growing industry and is expected to reach $3.11 billion by 2025. It has been used to handle the requests generated by the General Data Protection Regulation; by Tokio Marine Kiln for back-office transaction framework; by the nutrition company, Fonterra, to fix quantity mismatches in planning software SAP; and by Milaha for the entry, processing and transfer of data. The independent market research company Forrester Research identified Blue Prism as one of three companies that is considered a leader in the robotic process automation field both in terms of their market presence as well as the quality of their offering in a 2017 study.

An October 2018 study by Grand View Research, Inc. stated that the key companies in the RPA market included: Automation Anywhere, Inc.; Blue Prism Group PLC; UIPath; Be Informed B.V.; OpenSpan; and Jacada, Inc. In 2019, Gartner released its 'Magic Quadrant' for RPA, and Blue Prism was one of the leaders in the market.

Initial public offering
On 18 March 2016, Blue Prism undertook an IPO when the company floated on the London Stock Exchange AIM market with a market capitalisation of £48.5 million. The company's shares rose 44 percent on the first day of trading on AIM, under CEO Alastair Bathgate. Customers include O2, Co-operative Bank and Fidelity Investment Management. By November 2016, it had offices in Chicago and Miami, as well as the United Kingdom.

On 6 January 2017 Blue Prism announced it would open new offices in Austin, Texas, while remaining based in London. At the time, it employed 86 people worldwide. In March 2017, a group of shareholders sold stakes in Blue Prism. At the time, Blue Prism remained based in Merseyside. In June 2017, Blue Prism announced that a new version of its software would run on public clouds such as Amazon Web Services, Microsoft Azure, and Google Cloud Platform. Previously, the software had run on customers' own servers.

In 2019, Blue Prism announced changes to its platform and the issuing of new stock. It included a new AI engine, an updated marketplace for extensions, and a new lab for in-house AI innovation.

As of April 2020, the leadership team is made up of chairman and CEO Jason Kingdon and co-founder and CTO David Moss. Kingdon, an early investor in the company, became chairman in 2008 and led the company until its successful IPO in 2016. Kingdon returned as chairman in 2019 and became CEO in April 2020 when former CEO Alastair Bathgate stepped down, Kingdon remained CEO until 2022.

Acquisition
In September 2021, it was announced that Vista Equity Partners plans to acquire Blue Prism for £1.095 billion ($1.5 billion USD). Vista intends to merge Blue Prism into TIBCO Software. Vista is said to be considering “potentially material headcount reductions” of 8 to 10 per cent of the approximately 4,750 employees of the merged companies.

The original takeover deal was first announced in December 2021, when a bidding war between SS&C and Vista Equity partners drove up the price. Blue Prism shareholders ultimately voted in favor of SS&C. On March 16, 2022 SS&C Technologies (Nasdaq: SSNC) announced it had completed its acquisition of Blue Prism Group Plc ("Blue Prism") for approximately $1.6 billion (£1.25 billion).

Blue Prism technology
Blue Prism is built on the Microsoft .NET Framework. It automates any application and supports any platform (mainframe, Windows, WPF, Java, web, etc.) presented in a variety of ways (terminal emulator, thick client, thin client, web browser, Citrix and web services). It has been designed for a multi-environment deployment model (development, test, staging, and production) with both physical and logical access controls. Blue Prism RPA software includes a centralised release management interface and process change distribution model providing high levels of visibility and control. Additional control is provided to the business via a centralised model for process development and re-use. Blue prism records every system login, change in management action, and decisions and actions taken by the robots to identify statistics and real-time operational analytics. The software supports regulatory contexts such as PCI-DSS, HIPAA and SOX, with a large number of controls in place to provide the necessary security and governance. All of the process coding is automated on the back end, allowing even non-technical users to automate a process by dragging components into an interface.

In 2016, Blue Prism received one of the top honors at the AIconics Awards, named as The Best Enterprise Application of AI.  In 2017, the company was named one of MIT Tech Review's 50 Smartest Companies and was the winner of the UK Tech Awards.

In 2019, Blue Prism announced its idea for connected-RPA. Connected-RPA is the offering of an automation platform with AI and cognitive features built in. It includes features like a Digital Exchange, with online access to drag and drop AI, machine learning, and cognitive and disruptive technologies; a web-based tool that reduces the time to prepare for a RPA deployment; and an online community for sharing knowledge and best practices. The Digital Exchange gives customers and partners the ability to create and share tools that can be used with Blue Prism's software.  To encourage innovation, Blue Prism has an AI engine for building connectors to advanced AI tools from Amazon, Google, IBM, and other AI platforms.

In the summer of 2019, Blue Prism acquired Thoughtonomy for $100m. Thoughtonomy was later renamed Blue Prism Cloud. The acquisition provided Blue Prism with Cloud capabilities, allowing them to offer Automation as a Service over the cloud.

The digital workforce
Blue Prism's digital workforce is built, managed and owned by the user or customer, spanning operations and technology, adhering to an enterprise-wide robotic operating model. It is code-free and can automate any software in a non-invasive way. The digital workforce can be applied to automate processes in any department where clerical or administrative work is performed across an organisation.

Business and markets
Blue Prism has been deployed in a number of industries including banking, finance and insurance, consumer package goods, legal services, public sector, professional services, healthcare and utilities.

Its RPA software has been purchased by companies such as Coca-Cola, Pfizer, Prudential, Sony, and Walgreens.

In 2018, the UK water company United Utilities purchased robots from Blue Prism in order to use RPA to streamline its processes and increase efficiency. The robots monitor signals and alerts on the water network and automatically inform engineers of any issues.

The company IEG4 worked with Blue Prism to improve the handling of benefits claims with more efficient data processing.

The finance company Fannie Mae used an RPA platform from Blue Prism to automate a review and notification process within its mortgage operations area. Another finance institution, Mashreq, worked with Blue Prism to automate multiple functions, including banking operations, compliance, customer care and help desk operations.  In the healthcare industry, Ascension Health has used Blue Prism's RPA technology for back-office functions, and to manage the licensure and certification of clinicians.

In 2021, Blue Prism expanded its partnership with ABBYY, integrating their process and task mining capabilities.

Blue Prism Ventures 
In 2021, Blue Prism launched Blue Prism Ventures which helps venture partners find collaboration opportunities within the field of software robotic process automation. The company's first venture is in South Korea, Blue Prism Korea, with GTPlus Ltd.

References

External links
 

2001 establishments in England
Business software companies
Automation software
AI companies
British companies established in 2001
Software companies established in 2001
Companies based in Warrington
Software companies of England
Companies formerly listed on the Alternative Investment Market
2016 initial public offerings
2022 mergers and acquisitions